"The Common Law Origins of the Infield Fly Rule" is the title of an article by William S. Stevens published in 1975 in the University of Pennsylvania Law Review.  The brief eight-page article has vastly surpassed its modest original context, having been cited in federal and state judicial opinions and more than 100 works of legal literature.  It has been included in a number of anthologies of baseball law, and prompted copycat and parody articles. The New York Times called the article "one of the most celebrated and imitated analyses in American legal history."

The article

The article was published as an "aside," without attribution (as is often the case with brief student-authored law review articles).  Its author was University of Pennsylvania law student William S. Stevens, who invested his legitimate legal commentary with pseudo-gravitas ridiculing the pomposity often found in American law reviews.  The article is "genuinely funny, perhaps one of the funniest pieces of true scholarship in a field dominated mostly by turgid prose and ineffective attempts at humor."

Stevens's subject was the infield fly rule, a rule of baseball added about 1895 to close a loophole which in certain circumstances gave the defensive team an unfair advantage.  "Mr. Stevens described the infield-fly rule as a technical remedy for sneaky behavior that would not have occurred in the days when baseball was a gentlemen’s sport played for exercise."

Footnotes

Law review articles are notoriously heavy with footnotes. Stevens offered a "raft of footnotes dropped in like legal punch lines."  His sense of parody was evident from the first word of his text, "The," which he footnoted to the word's entry in the Oxford English Dictionary.:n.1 His second footnote recited the infield fly rule in its entirety, followed by a dry observation that "Depending upon the circumstances, other rules which may or may not apply to a particular situation include, inter alia, [the Federal Rules of Civil Procedure], Rule Against Perpetuities, and Rule of Matthew 7:12 & Luke 6:31 (Golden).":n.2

Many of the article's 48 footnotes are non-comedic, although some include such humor as:

 "For a discussion of origins, see generally Scopes v. State [the so-called "Monkey Trial"]; Genesis 1:1-2:9.":n.6

 "Raised by this statement [that "a batter with the 'speed of an ice wagon' hit a pop fly"] is the issue of the speed of an ice wagon in both relative and absolute terms.  Such inquiry is beyond the scope of this Aside.":n.26

 "To be contrasted with the doctrine of 'clean hands' [i.e., a doctrine in the Anglo-American system of equity] is the 'sticky fingers' doctrine." [The footnote goes on to discuss spitballs].:n.37

Argument

Stevens ambitiously tried to mix understated humor with serious legal comment. He explained that the article's purpose was "to examine whether the same types of forces that shaped the development of the common law also generated the Infield Fly Rule." Noting that England was the birthplace both of common law and of proto-baseball, Stevens discussed the Knickerbocker Base Ball Club, the first team using codified baseball rules, in 1845.  For the club's members, the "rules which governed their contests clearly indicate that the game was to be played by gentlemen.  Winning was not the objective; exercise was." As winning, however, came to be valued over exercise when the game spread beyond its gentlemanly origins, "written rules had to be made more and more specific, in order to preserve the spirit of the game.":1476

Pointing out examples of dubious play from professional baseball in the 1890s that led to the infield fly rule, the article turned to its legal analogy.  Stevens argued that the infield fly rule "emerged from the interplay of four factors, each of which closely resembles a major force in the development of the common law.":1478

Stevens's Factors Behind Development of the Infield Fly Rule

Conclusion

Stevens concluded his article by comparing the "dynamics of the common law" and the development of "one of the most important technical rules of baseball."  Both, he argued, were "essentially conservative," creating change only when a problem arose and only to the extent needed.  The article ended: "Although problems are solved very slowly when this attitude prevails, the solutions that are adopted do not create many new difficulties. If the process reaps few rewards, it also runs few risks.":1480-81

Copycat articles

Stevens was a young law student in his twenties and neither a law professor nor experienced attorney when he wrote the article. His premise was inventive, but somewhat stretched. Nevertheless, numerous copycat articles started to appear in the legal literature soon after the article's publication in June 1975.  Some applied the baseball and law theme to increasingly bizarre analogies, such as comparing the infield fly rule with the Internal Revenue Code.

Other metaphors include:

The Infield Fly Rule and other issues

Judicial citations

Relatively few judges cite student-written law review articles in their opinions.  However, at least nine judicial opinions contain citations to the article.  The first came quickly, in 1976, and citations have continued into the twenty-first century.  Most of the diverse collection of cases seem to use the article as a vehicle to discuss fairness in the law, or the plain meaning of words. Since these themes can easily be discussed without mentioning baseball, citations of the article seem to stem from an individual judge's sense of whimsy or wish to brighten an otherwise tedious adjudication.

Judicial opinions citing the article

Appearance in secondary legal literature

“Legal scholars simply cannot keep their hands off the infield fly rule — either substantively or as a metaphor."  Perhaps this is because the game of baseball is popular among lawyers. Another reason could simply be borrowed from legal historian Lawrence M. Friedman, commenting in his magisterial book A History of American Law, (p. 693, 2d ed. 1985) on the ubiquity of law reviews in America: "Virtually every law school, no matter how marginal, [publishes a law] review as a matter of local pride.  Somehow, all of these thousands of pages [must get] filled up with words."

Importance and impact of the article

The article has been called "the most famous law student note of all time."  Stevens's obituary in the New York Times contained this evaluation of the article: "It continues to be cited by courts and legal commentators. . . . It is credited with giving birth to the law and baseball movement, . . .. It made lawyers think about the law in a different way. . . . 'After Stevens, law reviews were never the same . . . It was a cultural revolution. It cannot be overstated.'”  The anthology Baseball and the American Legal Mind references the article as a "classic" that "provides an excellent example of the use of baseball wisdom to inform the development of legal thought." Astonished by the fame of his short work, Stevens later said “My ego is simultaneously flattered and bruised by the notion that something I cranked out more than 25 years ago would prove to be the highlight of my professional and academic careers.”

Notes and references

Notes

References

Bibliography

Selected cases citing the article

 Aluminum Co. of America v. Amerola Products Corp., 552 F.2d 1020 (3d Cir. 1977).
 Angiotech Pharmaceuticals Inc. v. Lee, 191 F. Supp. 3d 509 (E.D. Va. 2016).
 In re Grand Jury Subpoena, (Not Reported in F. Supp.) 1986 WL 13539 (D. Mass. 1986).
 Hinton v. Trans Union, LLC, 654 F. Supp. 2d 440 (E.D. Va. 2009). 
 Kessler v. Pennsylvania Nat. Mut. Cas. Ins. Co., 531 F.2d 248 (5th Cir. 1976).
 In re Leigh, 307 B.R. 324 (D. Mass. 2004).
 North County Contractor's Assn. v. Touchstone Ins. Services, 27 Cal.App.4th 1085, 33 Cal. Rptr. 2d 166 (1994).
 Payne v. Erie Ins. Exchange, 442 Md. 384, 112 A.3d 485 (Ct. App. 2015).
 Security Union Title Ins. Co. v. Superior Court (McKaig), 230 Cal.App.3d 378, 281 Cal. Rptr. 348 (1991).

Further reading

 Baker, Sir John Hamilton.  Introduction to English Legal History (1st ed. 1971, 2nd ed. 1979, 3rd ed. 1990, and 4th ed. 2002).  
 Milsom, S.F.C.  Historical Foundations of the Common Law. 1981.  
 Ritter, Lawrence S.  The Glory of Their Times: The Story of the Early Days of Baseball Told by the Men Who Played It. 2010.

See also

 Baseball law

Baseball mass media
Baseball culture
Law of the United States